The name Stanbridge, Quebec could refer to one of the following locations in the Brome-Missisquoi Regional County Municipality, Quebec

 Parishes
 Notre-Dame-de-Stanbridge, Quebec
 Saint-Ignace-de-Stanbridge, Quebec

 Municipalities
Stanbridge East, Quebec, known as the township of Stanbridge before 1997
Stanbridge Station, Quebec